Skea may refer to:

People
David Skea, a Scottish association football player of the 1890s
James Skea (born 1953), Scottish environmental academic

Places
Skea, County Fermanagh, a small village and townland in County Fermanagh, Northern Ireland
Skea, County Tyrone, a townland in County Tyrone, Northern Ireland